Unripe Fruit (Italian: Frutto acerbo) is a 1934 Italian comedy film directed by Carlo Ludovico Bragaglia and starring Lotte Menas, Nino Besozzi and Maria Wronska. A German-language version of the same story was made in Austria as A Precocious Girl.

Cast
 Lotte Menas as Lucy Carell - attrice di varietà 
 Nino Besozzi as Giorgio Verni  
 Maria Wronska as Madre di Lucy  
 Ugo Ceseri as Professore Ugoti  
 Matilde Casagrande as Gertrude - la governante  
 Giuseppe Porelli as Maggiordomo  
 Elevira Borelli as Eva  
 Nino Lary as Gigino  
 Luigi Cimara as Edoardo Manni  
 Carlo Petrangeli as Tort  
 Jone Frigerio as Educatrice  
 Alberto Gabrielli 
 Lucia Cannone

References

Bibliography 
 Pietro Piemontese. Remake: il cinema e la via dell'eterno ritorno. Castelvecchi, 2000.

External links 
 
 Unripe Fruit at Variety Distribution

1934 comedy films
Italian comedy films
1934 films
1930s Italian-language films
Films directed by Carlo Ludovico Bragaglia
Italian films based on plays
Italian black-and-white films
Italian remakes of foreign films
Remakes of Austrian films
1930s Italian films